Letitia  is a feminine given name, of Latin origin meaning "joy, gladness". The name Letitia has many variants, including but not limited to: Lætitia from lætus (Latin), Letja (Dutch), Letizia (Italian), Leticia (Spanish), Letisya (Turkish) and Letisha or Latisha (American). The name Letitia first appeared in the form Lettice in medieval England and is derived from the Roman goddess Lætitia of gaiety, symbolic of happiness, prosperity and abundance.

Variants

Letícia (Portuguese, Spanish, Hungarian)
Letitia (English), Spanish, Latin
Letizia (Italian)
Leata (English), Spanish
Lätitia (German)
Lätitzia (German)
Tizia (German)
Lätizia (German)
Lattecha (Jamaican) Spanish
Laetitia (French, Late Latin, German)
Letizia (Italian, Corsican)
Leticija (Latvian)
Letiția (Romanian, Moldovan)
Летиция (Russian)
Летисия (Russian)
Leticia (Spanish)
Lelê (Portuguese)
Leca (Portuguese)
Letja (Dutch)
Leleca (Portuguese)
Tica (Portuguese)
Letycja (Polish)
Leitis (Scottish)
Ledicia (Scottish)
Leti (Spanish)
Letisya (Turkish)
Lezinha (Portuguese)
Letisha (American)
Latisha (American)

People
 Queen Letizia of Spain (born 1972), Queen of Spain
 Letitia Baldrige (1926–2012), American etiquette expert
 Laetitia Casta (born 1978), French model and actress
 Letitia Chitty (1897–1982), English aeronautical engineer
 Letitia Christian Tyler (1790–1842), First Lady of the United States
 Letitia Dean (born 1967), English actress
 Letitia Dunbar-Harrison (born 1906), Irish librarian
 Letitia Gwynne (born 1962), Northern Irish television journalist
 Letitia James (born 1958), American politician
 Letitia Elizabeth Landon (1802–1838), English poet
 Letitia MacTavish Hargrave (1813–1854), Canadian fur trader
 Letitia Semple (1821–1907), American society figure and unofficial First Lady
 Letitia Stevenson (1843-1913), Second Lady of the United States
 Letitia Vriesde (born 1964), Surinamese athlete
 Lutitia "Tish" Harrison Warren (born 1979), American author and Anglican priest
 Letitia Wright (born 1993), Guyanese-English actress
 Letitia Youmans (1827–1896), Canadian temperance reformer

Fictional characters 
 Letitia Lerner
 Leta Lestrange in the films : Fantastic Beasts and where to find them , Fantastic Beasts: The Crimes of Grindelwald
 Letitia, Missy's mother in the film Surviving Christmas
 Letitia M. Slighcarp, recurring villain in Joan Aiken's The Wolves of Willoughby Chase
Letitia Mackenzie, in the TV series Outlander
Letitia (Dandridge) Lewis in the TV series Lovecraft Country
Laetitia Prism in Oscar Wilde's play The Importance of Being Earnest

Ships 
, ocean liner, later an armed merchant cruiser, troopship and hospital ship

Other 
 a mullein (plants in the genus Verbascum) cultivar

Feminine given names